In Modern English, she is a singular, feminine, third-person pronoun.

Morphology  
In Standard Modern English, she has four shapes representing five distinct word forms:

 she: the nominative (subjective) form
 her: the accusative (objective, also called the 'oblique'.) form; the dependent genitive (possessive) form
 hers: the independent genitive form
 herself: the reflexive form

History
Old English had a single third-person pronoun – from the Proto-Germanic demonstrative base *khi-, from PIE *ko- "this" – which had a plural and three genders in the singular. In early Middle English, one case was lost, and distinct pronouns started to develop. The modern pronoun it developed out of the neuter, singular in the 12th century. Her developed out of the feminine singular dative and genitive forms. The older pronoun had the following forms: 

The evolution of she is disputed. Some sources claim it evolved "from Old English seo, sio (accusative sie), fem. of demonstrative pronoun (masc. se) 'the,' from PIE root *so- 'this, that'" (see the). "In Middle English, the Old English system collapses, due to the gradual loss of þe and the replacement of the paradigm se, seo, þæt by indeclinable that."A more likely account is what is sometimes called the ' Shetland Theory', since it assumes a development parallel to that of Shetland < OScand. Hjaltland, Shapinsay < Hjalpandisey, etc. The starting point is the morphologically and chronologically preferable hēo. Once again we have syllabicity shift and vowel reduction, giving [heo̯] > [he̯o] > [hjoː]. Then [hj-] > [ç-], and [ç-] > [ʃ-], giving final [ʃoː]. Obviously, this doesn't lead to the modern form she /ʃiː/. "So any solution that gets [ʃ] from /eo/ also needs to 'correct' the resultant /oː/ (outside the north) to /eː/. This means an analogical transfer of (probably) the /eː/ of he." None of this is entirely plausible.

The -self forms developed in early Middle English, with hire self becoming herself. By the 15th century, the Middle English forms of she had solidified into those we use today.

Gender 
He had three genders in Old English, but in Middle English, the neuter and feminine genders split off. Today, she is the only feminine pronoun in English. It is occasionally used as a gender neutral, third-person, singular pronoun (see also singular they).

Syntax

Functions 
She can appear as a subject, object, determiner or predicative complement. The reflexive form also appears as an adjunct. She occasionally appears as a modifier in a noun phrase.

 Subject: She's there; her being there; she paid for herself to be there.
 Object: I saw her; I introduced him to her; She saw herself.
 Predicative complement: The only person there was her.
 Dependent determiner: This is her book.
 Independent determiner: This is hers.
 Adjunct: She did it herself.
 Modifier: The she goat was missing.

Dependents 
Pronouns rarely take dependents, but it is possible for she to have many of the same kind of dependents as other noun phrases.

 Relative clause modifier: she who arrives late
 Determiner: A: Somebody was here, and she left this. B: I'm that she.
 Adjective phrase modifier: the real her
 Adverb phrase external modifier: Not even her

Semantics 
She's referents are generally limited to individual, female persons, excluding the speaker and the addressee. She is always definite and usually specific.

Generic 
The pronoun she can also be used to refer to an unspecified person, as in If you see someone in trouble, help her. (See Gender above). This can seem very unnatural, even ungrammatical, as in examples like this:

 If either your mother or father would like to discuss it, I'll talk to her.

Non-human she 
She can be used for countries as political entities, but not as geographical entities.

 Canada really found her place in the world during WWII.
 *Canada's prairies are grassland, and she has five great lakes in Ontario.

She can also be used for ships and other inanimate objects of significance to the owner.

Many English style guides discourage the use of she for countries or inanimate objects, and such usage may be considered dated or sexist.

Deities 
"She" may refer to a particular goddess or to a monotheistic God when regarded as female. In this case it may be written "She" with reverential capitalization.

Pronunciation 
According to the OED, the following pronunciations are used:

Other 
In 1999, she was selected as the word of the millennium by the American Dialect Society.

References

See also

 English personal pronouns
 Third-person pronoun

English grammar
Modern English personal pronouns
Middle English personal pronouns
12th-century neologisms
Sociolinguistics
Terms for women